The 1998 Klang Valley water crisis occurred in Malaysia in February 1998 when the three reservoir dams in Klang Valley, Klang Gates Dam, Batu Dam and Semenyih Dam suffered a substantial drop in water level following the El Niño phenomenon. The subsequent water shortage affected almost all the residents in the Klang Valley causing the government to impose water rationing prior to the 1998 Commonwealth Games in Kuala Lumpur.

The shortage was blamed on El Nino despite actual rainfall in the months leading up to February 1998 in Federal Territory 
not being significantly below average. In fact in November 1997, Klang Gates Dam had its highest recorded rainfall. Similarly in October 1997 the Kajang station not far from the Semenyih dam had its highest rainfall in record.

See also
2014 Negeri Sembilan and Selangor water crisis

References

Health disasters in Malaysia
1998 health disasters
1998 in Malaysia
Water in Malaysia
Environmental issues with water
Klang Valley
1998 disasters in Malaysia